St. Naum of Ohrid (Macedonian: Свети Наум Охридски) is a Macedonian Orthodox Church located in Hamilton, Ontario, Canada.

Background

In 1970, Macedonians from the Hamilton region raised enough funds for the purchase of a church building on Kensington Ave. In 2003, the parish relocated to a new building at 1150 Stone Church Rd East. Apart from providing religious services, the church committee also manages a banquet hall, as well as Macedonian cultural groups and functions.

External links
American-Canadian Macedonian Orthodox Diocese
Official Website of the Macedonian Orthodox Church

Macedonian Orthodox churches in Canada
Churches in Hamilton, Ontario
Macedonian-Canadian culture